The Dubuque Intermodal Transportation Center (DITC) is a passenger transit hub located in Dubuque, Iowa, that serves as the new transfer center for Dubuque's bus system, between Jule buses and intercity buses serving Dubuque, and as a transfer point between other modes of land transportation. It is eventually hoped that the center will serve as the terminus for a new Chicago–Rockford–Dubuque Amtrak route that was expected to begin operation in late 2014 or early 2015, but was placed on indefinite hold due to lack of funding from the State of Illinois. The city of Dubuque has received an $8 million FTA state of good repair grant in addition to grants from several area institutions to go towards phase 1 of the center's construction. Phase 2 was planned to be funded by a TIGER V grant. That grant application failed, but alternative funding came from several other sources. On April 10, 2014, a new proposal for Amtrak service to terminate in Rockford was announced following the inability of the state of Illinois to reach a deal with the Canadian National Railway for use of their tracks. Due to the new proposal, the train station component of the center is on hold until a deal can be reached with the CN. The city of Dubuque broke ground on the rest of the DITC project in May 2014. The center, except for the train station portion, opened on August 17, 2015. A new transportation bill was passed by the state legislature in July 2019, supported by Governor J.B. Pritzker, with $275 million appropriated to begin the service.

See also
List of intercity bus stops in Iowa

References 

Future Amtrak stations in the United States
Transportation in Dubuque, Iowa
Transportation buildings and structures in Dubuque County, Iowa
Bus stations in Iowa
Transit centers in the United States